Gilbert Storey (1899-1987) was an Australian professional soccer player who played as a half-back for Balmain Gladstone and the Australia national soccer team.

International career
Storey began his international career with Australia in June 1923 on their second historic tour against New Zealand, debuting in a 1–4 loss to New Zealand. He was selected in the 1924 tour against Canada where he was sent off in a 4–1 win over Canada with no replacements allowed. Storey had also been injured in Australia's fifth test match against Canada on 12 July in a 1–4 loss, without him being able to play in Australia's final test.

Career statistics

International

References

1899 births
1987 deaths
Australian soccer players
Association football midfielders
Australia international soccer players